Cẩm Phả is a city of Quảng Ninh Province in the north-east region of Vietnam. It is an important coal exporting port of Vietnam (UNCTAD: VNCPH). As of February 2012, the city had a population of 195,800. The city covers an area of 486 km2. The city was promoted from Cẩm Phả District by February 2012. Cẩm Phả was the site of one of the biggest coal mines in south of Asia which has been exploited for almost a century. The coal mine featured on a special commemorative Vietnam stamp in March 1959. Coal still forms the basis of Cẩm Phả's local economy, with other industries including quarrying, lime production, port, agriculture, forestry and fisheries.

The official town website claims several scenic and historical sites in Cẩm Phả, including the Cửa Ông Temple, Rều Island (Monkey Island), Thẻ Vàng Island, the Vũng Đục historical site, and Hang Hanh cave.

History 
In 1884, Cẩm Phả came under French administration. On 24 August 1886, Bavienpour established the coal company  (SFCT). SFCT had the right to manage and exploit coal in the Hòn Gai, Cẩm Phả, and Mông Dương regions.

On 27 September 1945, during the August Revolution, workers drove the French out of Cẩm Phả. The French troops returned in November 1946, but the inhabitants fought back, destroying the coal mines, and hundreds of people were killed. The last French soldier withdrew from Cửa Ông, near the Cẩm Phả area on 22 April 1955. 

During the Vietnam War, American aircraft bombed Cẩm Phả several times due to its strategic importance.

On 30 October 1963, Cẩm Phả, formerly in Hồng Quảng province, came under the jurisdiction of Quảng Ninh province when Hải Ninh and Hồng Quảng provinces merged.

On 10 September 1981, Cẩm Phả's boundaries were redistributed. The town of Mông Dương was dissolved to form Mông Dương ward and Cẩm Hải commune.  Cửa Ông town became Cửa Ông ward. Cọc 6 town and Thái Bình commune became Cẩm Phú and Cẩm Thịnh wards.

On 21 February 2012, Cẩm Phả was upgraded from a town to a city.

Administrative divisions
The city contains 13 phường: Quang Hanh, Cẩm Thạch, Cẩm Thuỷ, Cẩm Trung, Cẩm Thành, Cẩm Tây, Cẩm Bình, Cẩm Đông, Cẩm Sơn, Cẩm Phú, Cẩm Thịnh, Cửa Ông, Mông Dương, and 3 communes: Dương Huy, Cộng Hoà, Cẩm Hải.

Port of Cẩm Phả
Though the port of Cẩm Phả has a general maximum draft of 4.8 metres, it has a separate coal loading terminal with a dredged depth of 6.1 metres and a channel depth of 7.1 metres. This allows ships of up to 10 metres draft to load due to the tidal range in the port. The coal loading terminal is 299 metres long, and can accommodate ships that are 165 metres in length, at an average loading rate of 6,000 tonnes per day.

Environment 
Coal mining in Cẩm Phả started over 100 years ago. Mining area discharges to the sea about 9 million m3 waste water and 8 million m3 domestic waste water. Another issue is deforestation, for example, from 1969 to 1974, about 42% of area of forest land was reduced.

Climate

Sports
The V.League 1 football club Than Quảng Ninh is based in Cẩm Phả. The club uses both Cửa Ông and Cẩm Phả stadia for its matches.

References

Districts of Quảng Ninh province
Cities in Vietnam